Samurai is a 2002 Indian Tamil-language vigilante action thriller film written and directed by Balaji Sakthivel, and produced by S. Sriram. The film stars Vikram in the title role, with supporting roles played by Anita Hassanandani, Jaya Seal, and Nassar. Cinematography was handled by Sethu Sriram and the music was scored by Harris Jayaraj.

Filming of Samurai started in 2000 but due to production delays, was not released until July 2002.

Plot
Thiyagarajan, a medical student, heads to meet his childhood friend Nisha. On the way, he meets a kind-hearted but naughty schoolgirl Deiva, who lives with her grandmother and is the daughter of a police officer named Sandana Pandian. Sandana has a run-in with Thiyagu, but later realizes his kind-heartedness. Thiyagu meets up with his friends to kidnap a politician for his illegal activities at which time, he finds out that Sandana's family are neighbors and good friends with his friend. After the dirty politician gets kidnapped, Sandana is appointed to investigate the case. 

Meanwhile, Thiyagu also kidnaps another five people, while Sandana is unable to catch the culprit. During this time, Nisha's friends try to molest Deiva. Unable to bear the trauma she experienced on her own, she returns to her parents. However, Sandana is already stressed out from the investigation and doesn't want to hear about Deiva's problems. Thiyagu helps to relieve Deiva's anxiety by telling her he now knows how to avoid that type of situation in the future. After that, Deiva, not knowing Thiyagu's true identity, falls in love with him.

Past: Thiyagu's studious classmate, Kavitha writes about the things, which she wants to tell Thiyagu in her diary, but never does. Although Thiyagu gets irritated with her, he still loves her. While attending medical school, Kavitha discovers that a pharmaceutical company has distributed dangerous medicines that caused a boy's death. When she tries to expose the company, no one supports her because they don't know the boy. This upset her so much she commits suicide. Before dying though, Kavitha asked Thiyagu to deliver justice for the boy's death on her behalf. After much thought, and after reading Kavitha's diary, Thiyagu and his friends decide to exact vengeance on those, who use a loophole in the law to complete their prison sentence in guest houses and hospitals. 

Present: Sandana discovers that the next target is a minister, who is behind the pharma crimes for which Kavitha committed suicide. Sandana tries to protect the minister, but he still gets kidnapped, where Sandana later realizes that Thiyagu is responsible for the kidnappings. Knowing Pandian is after him, Thiyagu tries to escape. When Deiva conveys her love to Thiyagu, he reveals his identity to her. Pandian captures Thiyagu and puts him on trial in an open court with magistrates and other people. They ask him to release the kidnapped people, but Thiyagu argues that he will only release them after they are punished with a capital punishment. 

The magistrates deny the request stating there is no law that has such a punishment. The abductees end up being released and everyone that heard Thiyagu's argument, form a protest and kills all the abductees. After this, Sandana takes Thiyagu and his friends away in a van, and appreciates his work by saying that there is a need for such a law that gives the culprits a punishment of death. As Thiyagu leaves, Deiva arrives, which reminds Thyagu of how he felt about Kavitha. Deiva tells him that Kavitha is always with him just as Deiva will be. Later, Thiyagu and his friends leave with Deiva.

Cast

Vikram as Thiyagarajan (Thiyagu)
Anita Hassanandani as Deiva
Jaya Seal as Kavitha
Nassar as Sandana Pandian
Anupam Shyam as Inspector
Kollam Thulasi as IAS Rajasekar
Chinni Jayanth as Varadarajan
Bindu Panicker as Deiva's mother
Vadivukkarasi as Deiva's grandmother
Delhi Kumar as Medical College Dean
George Maryan as a villager
Sriya Reddy as Nisha (special appearance)
Piyush Mishra as Politician (special appearance)

Production
Vikram signed the film in May 2000 and it became the first venture he committed to after the blockbuster success of Bala's Sethu. North Indian model Anita Hassanandani was selected to make her debut in the film, but another film, Varushamellam Vasantham starring Anita Hassanandani was released before Samurai.

Simran was approached to play a pivotal role in the film, but Jaya Seel, who appeared alongside Prabhu Deva in Pennin Manathai Thottu, was roped in instead to play a medical student. Malayalam actor Kollam Thulasi was signed up to play a villain in the film making his debut in Tamil films.

Vikram went to yoga classes to prepare for the opening scene for Samurai, where he poses in the Mayura asanam posture. In a 2002 interview, the actor stated that when he first met Balaji, "he was a very enthusiastic, charged person" and was able to convince Vikram to star in the film. He also compared Balaji with director Shankar.

Shooting commenced at Chennai and the unit then moved on to locations in Kuttralam, Ooty, Andhra, U.P. and Bihar. Some scenes with the lead pair were shot in the forest areas of Kerala which was also the location for a song shot on Vikram. Again, a lavish set was erected at the AVM Studios where Vikram, Anita, and new-face Shreya took part. The film was also heavily shot in Orissa, while songs were canned in Syria.

Release
Samurai opened in July 2002 to mixed reviews from critics. The Hindu's critic noted that "Samurai will satisfy action lovers but for those looking for innovation in story and screenplay, the soldier leaves you yearning". With respect to performances, the critic added that "with an admirably well-maintained physique and powerful eyes Vikram is all geared up for action". Moreover, "Anita is more of an essential prop, but Jayaseel in a cameo has scope to perform, which she does well".

Rediff.com wrote that "the net result is disappointing due to the worn-out theme that is very reminiscent of recent films". However, the reviewer also went on to say "Vikram, though, is convincing in his portrayal and the 'training' scenes where he gains expertise and invulnerability is thrilling and the stunt scenes draw applause".

The director himself later labelled the film a "damp squib" mentioning he made serious errors with the film's screenplay. The film successfully ran 100 days in theatres, ending a string of consecutive successful Vikram films in Dhill, Kasi and Gemini. However, despite this, it was reported that Balaji Sakthivel was still keen to make Vikram star in his next film, though the director next went on to make the successful low-budget film Kaadhal (2004). Samurai was later dubbed under the same name in Telugu to capitalise on Vikram's star potential. The film was also later dubbed into Hindi as Samurai: Ek Yodha in 2012 by Wide Angle Media Pvt. Ltd.

Soundtrack

The music and background score were composed by Harris Jayaraj.

References

External links

2002 films
Films shot in Tamil Nadu
Films shot in Andhra Pradesh
Films shot in Uttar Pradesh
Films shot in Bihar
Indian vigilante films
2000s Tamil-language films
Films scored by Harris Jayaraj
2002 directorial debut films
Films directed by Balaji Sakthivel